Jack Waite (born May 1, 1969) is an American former tennis player.

Waite won 3 doubles titles during his professional career. The right-hander reached his highest doubles ATP ranking in September 1997, when he became no. 44 in the world.

Career finals

Doubles (3 wins, 8 losses)

References

External links
 
 

Living people
1969 births
American male tennis players
Sportspeople from Madison, Wisconsin
Tennis people from Wisconsin
Tennis players at the 1995 Pan American Games
Pan American Games medalists in tennis
Pan American Games gold medalists for the United States
Medalists at the 1995 Pan American Games